Tiberio Calcagni (1532–1565) was an Italian sculptor and architect.

He was born in Florence, and accompanied Michelangelo to Rome, and was active about 1570. He completed or attempted to complete a number of his master's works after his death, including his Deposition. Calcagni died young.

Sources

1532 births
1565 deaths
16th-century Italian sculptors
Italian male sculptors
Renaissance sculptors